Gymnobathra is a genus of moths in the family Oecophoridae. It was first described by Edward Meyrick in 1883. All species are found in New Zealand.

Species
In alphabetical order:
Gymnobathra ambigua (Walker, 1864)
Gymnobathra bryaula Meyrick, 1905
Gymnobathra caliginosa Philpott, 1927
Gymnobathra calliploca Meyrick, 1883
Gymnobathra callixyla  (Meyrick, 1888)
Gymnobathra cenchrias (Meyrick, 1909)
Gymnobathra coarctatella (Walker, 1864)
Gymnobathra dinocosma (Meyrick, 1883)
Gymnobathra flavidella (Walker, 1864)
Gymnobathra hamatella (Walker, 1864)
Gymnobathra hyetodes Meyrick, 1884
Gymnobathra inaequata Philpott, 1928
Gymnobathra levigata Philpott, 1928
Gymnobathra omichleuta Meyrick, 1929
Gymnobathra omphalota Meyrick, 1888
Gymnobathra origenes Meyrick, 1936
Gymnobathra parca (Butler, 1877)
Gymnobathra philadelphia Meyrick, 1884
Gymnobathra primaria Philpott, 1928
Gymnobathra rufopunctella Hudson, 1951
Gymnobathra sarcoxantha Meyrick, 1884
Gymnobathra tholodella Meyrick, 1884
Gymnobathra zephyrana Clarke, 1926

References

Oecophoridae
Endemic fauna of New Zealand
Endemic moths of New Zealand